Cape Patience (Poluostrov Terpeniya) is a peninsula protruding  km of east-central Sakhalin Island into the Sea of Okhotsk. It forms the eastern boundary of the Gulf of Patience. The cape is the southernmost extension (on land) of the East Sakhalin Mountains, a north-south range that runs along the eastern side of Sakhalin Island.

There is a small lighthouse at the end of the cape, which was built in 1953.

Climate

References

Landforms of Sakhalin Oblast
Peninsulas of Russia